is a railway station in Suruga-ku, Shizuoka City, Shizuoka Prefecture, Japan, operated by Central Japan Railway Company (JR Tōkai).

Lines
Mochimune Station is served by the Tōkaidō Main Line, and is located 186.6 kilometers from the starting point of the line at Tokyo Station.

Station layout
The station has an island platform serving Track 2 and Track 3, and a side platform serving the seldom-used Track 1. The platforms are connected to the station building by a footbridge. The station building has automated ticket machines, TOICA automated turnstiles and a staffed ticket office.

Platforms

Adjacent stations

|-
!colspan=5|Central Japan Railway Company

History
A signal box was established at the site of present-day Mochimune Station on December 21, 1902. It was rebuilt as a station for both passenger and freight services on November 1, 1909. Regularly scheduled freight service was discontinued in 1974.

Station numbering was introduced to the section of the Tōkaidō Line operated JR Central in March 2018; Mochimune Station was assigned station number CA19.

Passenger statistics
In fiscal 2017, the station was used by an average of 1,537 passengers daily (boarding passengers only).

Surrounding area
Mochimune Fishing Port 
Mochimune Beach
Site of Mochimune Castle

See also
 List of Railway Stations in Japan

References

Yoshikawa, Fumio. Tokaido-sen 130-nen no ayumi. Grand-Prix Publishing (2002) .

External links

Official home page

Railway stations in Japan opened in 1909
Tōkaidō Main Line
Stations of Central Japan Railway Company
Railway stations in Shizuoka (city)